The Rona Cup is an annual ice hockey tournament held in Trenčín, Slovakia. The first installment of the Rona Cup was in 1994.

Rona Cup winners

Performances

By club (international tournaments)

By country (international tournaments)

References

External links
Official page of rona cup 

Ice hockey tournaments in Europe
Ice hockey competitions in Slovakia